John Bevan may refer to:

 John Bevan (cricketer) (1846–1918), Australian cricketer
 John Bevan (rugby) (born 1950), Welsh dual-code international who played rugby union for Cardiff and rugby league for Warrington
 John Bevan (rugby union) (1948–1986), Welsh international rugby union player for Aberavon RFC and later coach of the Wales national team
 John Bevan (politician) (1837–1911), New Zealand politician
 John Bevan (British Army officer) (1894–1978), World War II deception expert
 John M. Bevan (1924–2000), American academic and innovator
 John Bevan (figure skater) (born 1976), American figure skater
 John Bevan (musician) (born 1938), English clarinettist, saxophonist, conductor and orchestra leader